David A. Tjepkes (born April 22, 1944) is the Iowa State Representative from the 50th District. He has served in the Iowa House of Representatives since 2003.

, Tjepkes serves on several committees in the Iowa House - the Government Oversight, Judiciary, Local Government, and Public Safety committees.  He also serves as chair of the Transportation Committee and as a member of the Joint Government Oversight Committee and the Iowa Law Enforcement Academy Council.  His prior political experience includes serving as mayor of Gowrie.

Electoral history
*incumbent

References

External links

Representative Dave Tjepkes official Iowa General Assembly site
 
Profile at Iowa House Republicans

1944 births
Living people
People from Sibley, Iowa
Republican Party members of the Iowa House of Representatives
People from Webster County, Iowa
American United Methodists
Mayors of places in Iowa